Megan Henning is an American former actress.
She is known for playing Meredith Davies on 7th Heaven and Monica Shaw on David E. Kelley's The Brotherhood of Poland, New Hampshire. From 2008-2009 she played the recurring role of Judy Hofstadt, Betty Draper's compassionate sister-in-law, on Mad Men.

Filmography

Film

Television

Theater 
Henning starred in James Kerwin's adaptations of Shakespeare's Venus and Adonis and Cardenio.

External links 
 

American television actresses
American film actresses
American stage actresses
Living people
Year of birth missing (living people)